Zimný štadión Zvolen is an arena in Zvolen, Slovakia.  It is primarily used for ice hockey and is the home arena of HKm Zvolen. It has a capacity of 5,675 people and was built in 1969.

Notable events
An overview of some sport events:

1977
1977 IIHF World Under-20 Championship

1999
1999 ISBHF Ball Hockey World Championship

2008
2008 ISBHF U18 Junior World Championship
2008 ISBHF U16 Junior World Championship

Technical specifications
Dimensions of the rink of the main area: 28.1 x 58.1 m
Dimensions of the rink of the training area: 30 x 60 m
Stadium capacity: 5,675 seats
of which seating: 2,825 (including VIP box and SKY boxes)
of which standing: 2,600
VIP box: 194
SKY boxes: 56 (7 x 8 places)

Indoor ice hockey venues in Slovakia
Sports venues completed in 1966
HKM Zvolen
Buildings and structures in Zvolen
Sport in Banská Bystrica Region
1966 establishments in Slovakia